You and Me is the sixteenth studio album by American country music singer-songwriter Tammy Wynette. It was released on September 27, 1976, by Epic Records.

Commercial performance 
The album peaked at No. 4 on the Billboard Country Albums chart. The album's only single, "You and Me", peaked at No. 1 on the Billboard Country Singles chart.

Track listing

Personnel
Adapted from the album liner notes.
Lou Bradley - engineer
The Jordanaires - backing vocals
Bill McElhiney - string arrangements
Billy Sherrill - producer
Tammy Wynette - lead vocals

Chart positions

Album

Singles

References

1976 albums
Tammy Wynette albums
Epic Records albums
Albums produced by Billy Sherrill